These are the team rosters of the 16 teams competing in the FIBA Africa Championship 2009.

Group A

Head coach:  Randoald Dessarzin

Head coach:  Neven Filip-Luetic

Head coach:  John Lucas

Head coach:  Flosh Ngwenya

Group B

Head coach:  Luis Magalhaes

Head coach:   Zeljko Zecevic

Head coach:  Hugues Occansey

Head coach:  Carlos Alberto Niquice

Group C

Head coach:  Lazare Adingono

Head coach:  Eugene Pehoua-Pelema

Head coach:  Maxime Mbochi

Head coach:  Abdourahmane N'Diaye

Group D

Head coach:  Nwora Alexander

Head coach:  Frances Jordane

Head coach:  Veceslav Kavedzija

Head coach:  Adel Tlatli

See also
 2009 FIBA Africa Clubs Champions Cup squads

References 
 FIBA Africa Championship 2009 Team Rosters
 Eurobasket
 Africabasket

2009 squads
squads